Neyzar (also Romanized as Neyzār) is a village in Sarcheshmeh Rural District, in the Central District of Rafsanjan County, Kerman Province, Iran. At the 2006 census, its population was 17, in 7 families.

References 

Populated places in Rafsanjan County